Arumbu Meesai Kurumbu Paarvai is a 2011 Indian Tamil-language coming-of-age drama film directed by newcomer Vetriveeran and stars newcomer Chandru and Hasini.

Plot 
The film follows Chandru, and his fights against the anti-social elements in his village government hostel.

Cast 
Chandru as Gunasekharan
Hasini as Jayanthi
R. Mohanbalu as the warden
Ollikumar as Moovendran
Pradip Belki
Deivendran as the cook
Ugrapandi as Oothadiyan

Production 
Director Vetriveeran previously worked as an assistant to Bharathiraja. Hashini, who played one of the leads in Velvi, stars in this film.

Soundtrack 
The music is composed by Mohammed Rizwan. The lyrics are written by Vairamuthu and Karthik Netha. Vairamuthu recommended Rizwan to be the film's music composer.
"Viduthi Vaazhkai Viduthi" - Krishnamoorthy, Vignesh, Rag
"Naan Thaan Kadhal" - Ravi, Ujjaini Rai
"Varuginrdraan" - Mohammed Rizwan, Renina R.
"Aadaatha Aattam* - Mukesh, Hema
"Idupazhagi O Maame" - Ajeesh Ashok, Saindhavi

Reception 
A critic from The New Indian Express wrote that "Despite its flippant title, AMKP is an engaging, thought- provoking campus story with a difference". A critic from Dinamalar praised the film and its unique characters.

References